Banda is a constituency of the Uttar Pradesh Legislative Assembly covering the city of Banda in the Banda district of Uttar Pradesh, India. Banda is one of five assembly constituencies in the Lok Sabha constituency of Banda. Since 2008, this assembly constituency is numbered 235 amongst 403 constituencies.

Currently this seat belongs to Bharatiya Janta Party candidate Prakash Dwivedi who won in last Assembly election of 2017 Uttar Pradesh Legislative Elections defeating Bahujan Samaj Party candidate Madhusudan Kushwaha by a margin of 32,828 votes.

References

External links
 

Assembly constituencies of Uttar Pradesh
Banda, Uttar Pradesh